The 2018 Nebraska State Legislature elections took place as part of the biennial United States elections. Nebraska voters elected state senators in the 24 even-numbered seats of the 49 legislative districts in the Nebraska Unicameral. Nebraska is unique among American states in that there is only one chamber in its state legislature, and this chamber is called the Unicameral and the State Legislature interchangeably. State senators serve four-year terms in the Nebraska Unicameral.

A top two primary election on May 15, 2018 determined which candidates appear on the November 6 general election ballot. Each candidate technically runs as a non-partisan (i.e., no party preference).

Following the 2016 elections, Republicans maintained effective control of the Nebraska State Legislature with 32 seats. Democrats increased their numbers from 15 to 16 seats when State Senator Bob Krist of the 10th legislative district switched parties from Republican to Democrat. Furthermore, Republican State Senator Jim Smith resigned from office, leaving an open seat for Republicans to defend in the 14th legislative district.

On election day 2018, the Unicameral consisted of 31 Republican seats, 16 Democratic seats, and 1 seat each for Independent Sen. Ernie Chambers and Libertarian Sen. Laura Ebke. The Democrats net gained 2 seats, while the Republicans net lost one and the chamber's lone Libertarian was defeated.

Summary of Results by State Legislative District
Note: All elections are technically non-partisan in the Nebraska State Legislature; therefore, parties listed here are from candidates' websites and official party endorsement lists. Candidates all appear on the ballot without party labels.
Districts not shown are not up for election until 2020.

Sources:

Close races

Detailed Results

Sources:

District 2

District 4

District 6

District 8
Burke Harr (incumbent) was term-limited.

District 10
Bob Krist (incumbent) was term-limited.

District 12

District 14
Jim Smith (incumbent) was term-limited.

District 16
Lydia Brasch (incumbent) was term-limited.

District 18

District 20

District 22
Paul Schumacher (incumbent) was term-limited.

District 24

District 26

District 28

District 30
Roy Baker (incumbent) retired.

District 32

District 34

District 36

District 38
John Kuehn (incumbent) retired.

District 40
Tyson Larson (incumbent) was term-limited.

District 42

District 44

District 46

District 48

See also
 United States elections, 2018
 United States House of Representatives elections in Nebraska, 2018
 United States Senate election in Nebraska, 2018
 Nebraska gubernatorial election, 2018
 Nebraska Attorney General election, 2018
 Nebraska Secretary of State election, 2018
 Nebraska elections, 2018

References

legislature
Nebraska State Legislature
Nebraska Legislature elections
Non-partisan elections